Nour Ullah Noor (June 8, 1944) is a retired Afghanistan Greco-Roman wrestler, who competed at the 1964 Summer Olympics in the bantamweight events.

References

External links

Wrestlers at the 1964 Summer Olympics
Afghan male sport wrestlers
Olympic wrestlers of Afghanistan
1944 births
Living people
Place of birth missing (living people)
20th-century Afghan people